The Carter Coal Company Store was a historic company store building located at Coalwood, McDowell County, West Virginia.  It was built by the Carter Coal Company about 1912, and remodeled in 1922.  The one-story brick building housed a store, company offices, and a post office.

It was listed on the National Register of Historic Places in 1992.

The building was demolished on March 29, 2008, by owner Alawest.  The site is now a grassy plot with a gazebo.

See also 
 Carter Coal Company Store (Caretta, West Virginia)
 Carter v. Carter Coal Co.

References

Commercial buildings on the National Register of Historic Places in West Virginia
Commercial buildings completed in 1922
Demolished buildings and structures in West Virginia
National Register of Historic Places in McDowell County, West Virginia
Commercial buildings completed in 1912
Former post office buildings
Post office buildings on the National Register of Historic Places in West Virginia
1912 establishments in West Virginia
Company stores in the United States